Professor Richard Lawrance Carter CBE, FRCP, FRCPath (born 1934) is a British histopathologist.

He graduated from Oxford University in 1960.

He then worked as an histopathologist at the Royal Marsden Hospital. From 1974 to 2001 he was an Honorary Consultant and Reader at the Institute of Cancer Research.

He was Honorary Professor at the University of Surrey from 1994 to 2002.

From 1985 to 1995, he served as chair of the Department of Health's Carcinogenicity Committee, and sat on other government committees.

He as made a Commander of the Order of the British Empire (CBE) in the 1997 Birthday Honours, "For services to Health Care".

References

External links 

 

1934 births
Place of birth missing (living people)
Commanders of the Order of the British Empire
Fellows of the Royal College of Physicians
Fellows of the Royal College of Pathologists
Histopathologists
Alumni of the University of Oxford
Academics of the University of Surrey
Academics of the Institute of Cancer Research
Living people